The following is a list of radio show episodes of the public television cooking show America's Test Kitchen in the United States. The radio show debuted in January 2012 and is distributed by PRX.

Radio Shows

Season 1

Season 2

Season 3

Season 4

Season 5 

Lists of radio series episodes